La Scie (sometimes spelled "LaScie") is a town in the Canadian province of Newfoundland and Labrador. The town had a population of 820 in the Canada 2021 Census, down from 872 in 2016.

History
The name of the town originates from French fishermen who called it La Scie, which in French means "The Saw". This is reference to the silhouette of the hills around the town which resemble the teeth of a saw blade. This is also depicted in the town's seal. LaScie was settled by Irish and English fisherman after the French relinquished their fishing rights to the French Shore in 1904. By 1911 the population had grown to 429.

The United States Air Force built and operated a radar station in the area from 1957 to 1961.

On November 7, 2020, a fire destroyed a town building which housed the community's fire hall, the local ambulance service, a library, family resource centre and council chambers.

Demographics 

See also
 List of cities and towns in Newfoundland and Labrador
 La Scie Air Station

References

Towns in Newfoundland and Labrador